Khaliapali is a census town in Bargarh district in the Indian state of Odisha. Famous people from Khaliapali include the Khond saint Bhima Bhoi. ACC Cement Plant is located in Khaliapali village which provides employment to most of the youths of this village. The majority of the population depend on farming, specifically rice cultivation, which forms the bulk of the area's agricultural output. 

The Dussehra celebration (also known as Vijayadashami) is very grand here and it attracts thousands of worshippers from all across the district.

Demographics
 India census, Khaliapali had a population of 6865, up from 5257 in 2001. Males constitute 51% of the population and females 49%. Khaliapali has an average literacy rate of 72%. 13% of the population is under 7 years of age.

References

Cities and towns in Bargarh district